was a railway station on the Sasshō Line in Tsukigata, Kabato District, Hokkaido, Japan, operated by Hokkaido Railway Company (JR Hokkaido).

Lines
Sappinai Station was served by the Sasshō Line.

Station layout
The station had a side platform serving one track. The unmanned station building was located beside the platform.

Adjacent stations

History
The station opened on 3 October 1935. With the privatization of JNR on 1 April 1987, the station came under the control of JR Hokkaido.

In December 2018, it was announced that the station would be closed on 7 May 2020, along with the rest of the non-electrified section of the Sasshō Line. The actual last service was on 17 April 2020 amid the COVID-19 outbreak.

References

Stations of Hokkaido Railway Company
Railway stations in Hokkaido Prefecture
Railway stations in Japan opened in 1935
Railway stations closed in 2020